The Sentencing Guidelines Council was a non-departmental public body of the United Kingdom government, created by s.167 of the Criminal Justice Act 2003. It gave authoritative guidance on sentencing to the courts of England and Wales.  It was replaced in April 2010 by the Sentencing Council.

Constitution
The Council was chaired by the Lord Chief Justice of England and Wales and comprised seven judicial members, appointed by the Lord Chancellor after consultation with the Lord Chief Justice and the Home Secretary, and four non-judicial members, appointed by the Home Secretary after consultation with the Lord Chancellor and Lord Chief Justice.

The seven judicial members had to include a circuit judge, a district judge (magistrates courts) and a lay magistrate. The non-judicial members had to be experienced in policing, criminal prosecution, criminal defence or victim welfare.

External links
Official website

Government bodies based in London
2003 establishments in England
2010 disestablishments in England
Legal organisations based in England and Wales
English criminal law
Guidelines Council
Penology
Ministry of Justice (United Kingdom)
Defunct public bodies of the United Kingdom
Government agencies established in 2003
Government agencies disestablished in 2010